The 1851-1855 Yellow River floods resulted in a change of the Yellow River's course, thereafter emptying into the Bohai Sea rather than into the Yellow Sea. This natural disaster is thought to have been a major cause of the Taiping Rebellion and Nian Rebellion.

References

1851 in China
Yellow River
Floods in China

Yellow River floods